A number of motor vessels have been named Boundary, including:

 , a Panaminan ship in service 1970–72
 , a Marshallese ship in current service

Ship names